Aristid von Würtzler (born as Würtzler Arisztid) (September 20, 1925, Budapest – November 30, 1997, Debrecen) Hungarian-American harpist, composer, leader of the New York Harp Ensemble.

Biography

Aristid von Würtzler was born into a middle-class family. His father was a violinist, a music critic and composer, who had devoted much attention to his sons’ musical education. His older brother, Béla Würtzler also became a musician. Aristid received his education at the Lutheran High School in Aszód and at the Franz Liszt Academy of Music in Budapest.

Initially Aristid studied piano and cello, and then switched to harp at the age of 12–13 years. His first teacher was Henrik Rohmann. At the Academy he studied harp with Miklós Rékai and composition with Zoltán Kodály. Würtzler was expelled from the Academy once because he had not attended lectures on Marxism. But he was taken back by the intervention of Director Ede Zathureczky. Of his teachers he remembered Zoltán Kodály with pleasure. He considered him his mentor and invited him later to the USA.

Würtzler's last performance in Hungary took place on 22 November 1956, in the Opera House when he was substituting for the bedridden Rékai.

When the revolution began he left Hungary with Béla. Although he did not take part in the events of the Hungarian revolution, nevertheless he was afraid of retribution. However he believed that a harpist's career could reach its full potential only in a freer world. He went first to Vienna and then established his residence in the United States. Speaking no English he took a number of odd jobs; he even collected waste empty bottles. For a time he lived in a house occupied by prostitutes, who kindly loaned him the money to buy his first harp.

In 1958 Würtzler began his new career as the first harpist of the Detroit Symphony Orchestra and then the New York Philharmonic. Leonard Bernstein (musical director) auditioned him; Aristid played, inter alia, Smetana's Vltava, Debussy's Prelude to the Afternoon of a Faun, and Bartók's Concerto for (Piano and) Orchestra. Béla remained in Detroit and only later joined the Boston Symphony Orchestra.

The International Harp Contest, held in Israel, was the first harp competition in the world. It was launched in 1959 by A. Z. Propes. Three years later, in 1962, Pierre Jamet, the French virtuoso and professor of harp founded the International Association of Harpists and Friends of the Harp,

These events inspired Würtzler to become an active member of the American harp community. From 1963 he served as a Professor of Harp at the University of Hartford where he established annual Harp Master Classes. He invited famous foreign musicians to join his master classes, e.g. the above-mentioned Pierre Jamet; Hans Joachim Zingel, the renowned expert of harp-literature from Cologne; the Belgian and Soviet harpists Mireille Flour and Vera Dulova; and Khachaturian, the Armenian composer.

In 1969, Würtzler organized the first international harp competition ever held in the United States thought his primacy is contested by some. During this time he had had many confrontations with others, so, in 1970, he moved on. He served as a Professor at New York University, Hofstra University, Queens College of the City University of New York and Bridgeport University in Connecticut.

Also in 1970, Würtzler formed his own band, a group of four harps, internationally known as the New York Harp Ensemble (NYHE). As an established composer and an arranger he created for the group a repertoire of almost two hundred pieces. There were four women in the group; his wife, the Polish-born Barbara Pniewska was also a founding member.

With the ensemble and also as a soloist Würtzler performed in over sixty countries, made numerous compact discs and had several invitations to play at the White House during the Carter, Reagan, Bush and Clinton administrations. He was also invited to perform for  Pope John Paul II at the Vatican in 1985. The NYHE hit their prime in the 1970s and 1980s.

In his other pursuits, Würtzler served as a member of the Jury at the Harp Contests in Israel, Switzerland and Italy. He also presided at Harp Master Classes in Germany.

In spite of his international acclaim, in his heart Würtzler remained passionately devoted to his native Hungary and he returned regularly from the mid-seventies. Although he was embittered by the situation of music- and especially harp education, he devoted his energies to the musical life of his country. He established annual Harp Master Classes and gave several concerts in Budapest, in Szombathely and in the Helikon Castle in Keszthely. He performed with Éva Marton on several occasions and some of his (latest) records were issued by Hungaroton.

Besides his teaching he also found time to add to and extend harp-literature. He called upon famous composers (e.g. Bernstein, Karlheinz Stockhausen, György Ligeti, etc.) to write pieces for harp and he himself composed many original pieces, transcriptions and adaptations.

Würtzler died on November 30, 1997, of a heart attack while touring in Hungary, where he was appearing as a conductor. He was cremated and his ashes were returned to his native Budapest. Carl Swanson harp-maker, his former Hartford pupil wrote an obituary for him. He noted in another of his writings that Würtzler's bisbigliando was magical; nobody else could do it better.

Orchestras

 Hungarian State Orchestra (Hungary), 1951–56
 Detroit Symphony Orchestra (USA), 1957–58
 New York Philharmonic (USA), 1958–61

Education

 Hartt College of Music, University of Hartford (USA), 1963–70
 New York University (USA), 1970–87
 Hofstra University (USA), 1970–72
 University of Bridgeport (USA), 1974–78
 Aaron Copland School of Music, Queens College, City University (USA), 1982–1997

Harp competition and master courses

 Hartt College of Music, University of Hartford (USA), 1963–1970
 New College, Sarasota, Florida - Summer Festival (USA), 1970, 1971
 State University of New York - Planting Fields (USA), 1970
 Sion (Switzerland), Heimbach (Germany) and Gitta de Castello, (Italy) 1972-78
 Shanghai, Beijing (China), 1982
 Cairo Conservatoire (Egypt), 1985
 Franz Liszt Academy of Music (Hungary), 1987
 Szombathely (Hungary), 1988
 Keszthely (Hungary), from 1990

Jury

 International Harp Competition (Switzerland), 1964, 1974
 International Harp Competition (Israel), 1965 (honorary member)
 International Harp Competition (USA), 1969
 International Harp Competition (Italy), 1978, 1980

Works, compositions

Commissioned pieces

 Concert Improvisation - Hartt College of Music (USA), 1969
 Little Suite - Nimura Harp Ensemble (Japan), 1970
 Modern Sketches - Rhine Chamber Orchestra (Germany), 1972

Harp solos

 Bartók, Béla Vol. I. for Solo Harp (Lyra Music, International Music Service)
 Brilliant Romantic Etude (General Music Publication)
 Capriccio for Solo Harp. Memory of Salzedo (Lyra Music, International Music Service)
 Concert Improvisation (Lyra Music, International Music Service)
 Donizetti, Gaetano - von Würtzler: Lucia di Lammermoori. Paraphrase (General Music Publication)
 Händel, George Friedrich - von Würtzler: Concerto in F Major with Cadenza by von Würtzler (General Music Publication)
 Lullaby (Lyra Music, International Music Service)
 Menuet (Lyra Music, International Music Service)
 Modern Sketches (Southern Music Publication)
 Old Dance (Lyra Music, International Music Service)
 Puppet Dance (Lyra Music, International Music Service)
 Variations on a theme of Corelli (General Music Publication)
 Vivaldi, Antonio - von Würtzler: Concerto in D Major (General Music Publication)

Original works

 Canto Amoroso (F. C. Publishing Co.)
 Caprice de Concert (F. C. Publishing Co.)
 Little Tale (F. C. Publishing Co.)
 Meditation (Salvi International Corp.)
 Paraphrase on a Theme from Rigoletto (F. C. Publishing Co.)
 Tale for the Boys (Salvi International Corp.)
 Three Miniatures for Violin and Harp (Salvi International Corp.)
 Vivaldi, Antonio: Concerto (F. C. Publishing Co.)

Covers, transcripts

 Bach, Christian: Concerto „God Save the King”. Cadenza: von Würtzler (Salvi International Corp.)
 Bartók, Béla: Rumanian Folk Dances for Solo Harp (Salvi International Corp.)
 Bartók, Béla: Vol. II. for Solo Harp (Salvi International Corp.)
 Chinese folk song: Amid Flowers Beside the River Under the Spring (Salvi International Corp.)
 Franck, César: Agnus Dei for Solo Harp (F. C. Publishing Co.)
 Kodály, Zoltán: Gyermektáncok (Salvi International Corp.)
 Kodály, Zoltán: Intermezzo from Háry János (Salvi International Corp.)
 Kodály, Zoltán: Székely nóta, Hungarian Songs (3) (Magyar parasztdalok)
 Landscape in Sunset. Original work from China, edited by von Würtzler. (Salvi International Corp.)
 Marcello, Benedetto: Adagio for Solo Harp (F. C. Publishing Co.)
 Noon. Edited by von Würtzler (Salvi International Corp.)
 The Cherry Blossoms. Original work from China, edited by von Würtzler. (Salvi International Corp.)
 The Voice of Youth. Original work from China, edited by von Würtzler. (Salvi International Corp.)
 Vivaldi, Antonio: D Major Concerto PVW 209 with Cadenza (F. C. Publishing Co.)
 Vivaldi, Antonio: Largo from Concerto in D Major PVW 209 (F. C. Publishing Co.)
 XVIII Century Hungarian Dances (Salvi International Corp.)

Invitations

 Bernstein, Leonard (USA): Chorale and Meditation
 Chiti, Gianopaulo (Italy): Breakers
 Creston, Paul (USA): Olympia Rhapsody for Harp
 Damase, Jean-Michel (France): Concertino
 Dello Joio, Norman (USA): Bagatella
 Durkó Zsolt (Hungary): Serenata Per Quatro Arpas
 Flagello, Nicolas (USA): Arismo II. for 4 Harps, Island of Mysterious Bells
 Hanuš, Jan (Czechoslovakia): Introduzione E Toccata
 Hidas Frigyes (Hungary): Hungarian Melodies
 Hovhaness, Alari (USA) - Stuart Colidge: Spirituals in Sunshine and Shadow
 Kasilag, Lucrecia R. (Philippines): Diversions II for 4 Harps
 Ligeti György (Hungary/Germany): Continuum
 Maayani, Ami (Israel): Arabesque for 4 Harps
 Mchedelov, Mikhail (Soviet Union): Song Procession for 4 Harps and Drum
 Montori, Sergio (Italy): Iron Garden
 Saygun, Ahmed Adnan (Turkey): Three Preludes for Four Harps, Three Melodies for Four Harps
 Serly Tibor (Hungary/USA): Canonic Prelude for 4 Harps
 Takemitsu, Toru (Japan): Wavelength
 Wha, Lin (China): Amid Flowers Beside the River
 Wiłkomirski, Josef (Poland): Concerto for Four Harps

Records

 Vivaldi: Concerto (with New York Philharmonic, conductor: Leonard Bernstein, Columbia)
 New York Harps Ensemble/CRS 4130 Golden Crest Quadrophonic
 New York Harp Ensemble/CRS 4121 Golden Crest Quadrophonic
 18th Century Concerti and Strings, Musical Heritage Society 3320
 18th Century Concerti Stereo Cassette MHC 5320
 XVIII Century Music for Harp Ensemble MHS 3239
 XVIII Century Stereo Cassette MHC 5239
 Contemporary Music for Harp Ensemble MHS 1184
 Contemporary Stereo Cassette MHC 2100
 Contemporary Music for Harp and Strings MHS 3370 (Solo: von Würtzler)
 American Cavalcade MHS 3307
 Romantic Music for Harp Ens. and Solo Harp MHS 3611 (Solo: von Würtzler)
 Romantic Music Stereo Cassette MHC 5611
 Musical Memories, Vol. I. MHS 3670
 Musical Memories, Vol. I. Stereo Cassette MHC 5670
 Christmas with New York Harp Ensemble MHS 3483 (Solo: von Würtzler)
 Christmas with New York Harp Ensemble Stereo Cassette MHC 5483
 An Evening with the New York Harp Ensemble MHS 3890 (Solo: von Würtzler)
 Musical Memories Vol. II. MHS 4259 (Solo: von Würtzler)
 Musical Memories, Vol. II. Stereo Cassette MHC 6259 (Solo: von Würtzler)
 Rhapsody for Harp and Orchestra, MHS 4387 (Solo: von Würtzler)
 Mostly Concertos, MHS 4260 (Solo: von Würtzler)
 The New York Harp Ensemble, Hungaroton SLPX 12726
 The New York Harp Ensemble, Hungaroton, MK 12726
 The New York Harp Ensemble, Hungaroton Stereo HCD 12726
 A Pastorale Christmas, MusicMasters, MMD 20098A
 A Pastorale Christmas, MusicMasters Stereo Cassette, MMC 40098Z
 A Pastorale Christmas, MusicMasters Compact Disc. CD MMD 60098Y
 A Pastorale Christmas with NYH Ensemble MHS 4610 Digital-Stereo
 A Pastorale Christmas with NYH Ensemble Digital-Stereo Cassette 6611
 Weinachtiiche Harfenmusik NYHE and Pro Arte Chamber Orchestra, conductor: Aristid von Würtzler, Orfeo, Stereo-Digital-S 122 841 B
 Éva Marton with the New York Ensemble, Hungaroton SLPD 12939
 Éva Marton with the New York Harp Ensemble, Hungaroton MK 12939
 Éva Marton with the New York Harp Ensemble, Hungaroton HDC 12939
 Hungaroton Highlights, 1987–88, Hungaroton, HCD 1661

Awards

 London College of Applied Science (USA), honorary doctorate, 1968
 Order of Merit of the Republic of Hungary

Bibliography

 Előd Juhász - István Kaposi Kis: Beszélő hárfa. Aristid von Würtzler. Idegenforgalmi Propaganda és Kiadó Vállalat, Budapest, 1990.

External links 
 First Hungarian Harpblog
 Interview with Barbara von Würtzler Polish-American Harpist
 Carl Swanson's website

Hungarian emigrants to the United States
Hungarian nobility
Hungarian-German people
Hungarian composers
Hungarian male composers
Hungarian harpists
20th-century American male musicians
American harpists
20th-century American composers
20th-century American conductors (music)
American music educators
1925 births
1997 deaths
Recipients of the Order of Merit of the Republic of Hungary
University of Hartford Hartt School faculty
20th-century composers
20th-century Hungarian male musicians